Dudley Persse (1625–1699) was an Anglo-Irish landlord and Anglican priest.

He was a grandson of the Rev. Robert Persse (died 1612), who originated in Northumberland but settled in Ireland in the late 16th century and was buried at Bodenstown, County Kildare. Dudley's father (Henry of Clane) was one of three sons born to Robert Persse. Henry married an Elizabeth (surname unknown) and was dead by 1673, Sybil and Dudley being his only two children.

Dudley Persse was educated at Trinity College, Dublin, matriculating in 1641 and was ordained into the Anglican Church. He served as Dean of Kilmacduagh. and Archdeacon of Tuam.

He purchased the Spring Garden estate in County Galway, where he lived until he purchased Cregarosta in the same county, between Loughrea and Gort. He built a house there, which he named Roxborough in honour of Northumberland and which was thereafter was the seat of the Persse family for 245 years until destroyed by fire in 1922 during the Irish Civil War.

He married Sarah, daughter of John Crofton of Lisnadurn, County Roscommon and had issue:

 Henry High Sheriff of County Galway, 1701
 William High Sheriff of County Galway, 1711
 Catherine, married Major Hugh Galbraith of Capard
 Alice, married Captain William Colles of Sligo
 Daughter (name unknown), married a Mr. Nethercott
 Daughter (name unknown), married Mr. Ormsby of Tubbervaddy
 Daughter (name unknown), married Mr. Hickman of County Clare
 Sarah, married John Blakeney of Castle Blakeney

Genealogy
Persse founded a dynasty that was to dominate society in Galway and Connacht into the early 20th century. The family was prolific, members including:

 William Persse, Irish volunteer (c. 1728 – 1802) 
 Henry Stratford Persse, writer (died 1833)
 Sarah Persse, suffragist, fl. 1899
 Augusta, Lady Gregory, Irish nationalist, landlord, author and dramatist (1852–1932)
 Hugh Lane, Irish art dealer, collector and gallery director (1875–1915)

References

1625 births
1699 deaths
Alumni of Trinity College Dublin
People from County Galway
Irish Anglicans
Church of Ireland
Deans of Kilmacduagh
Archdeacons of Tuam
Irish landlords
17th-century Irish landowners